The 2004 season was Daegu F.C.'s second season in the South Korean K-League.

Season summary

The club's foundation captain, Kim Hak-Cheol, had left Daegu to join the newly formed Incheon United, which was making its K-League debut. Hong Soon-Hak, a midfielder who had played a number of games the previous season, was designated captain.  While all of the imports from the previous season bar Indio were released following the conclusion of the club's first season, Nonato and Jefferson, both Brazilian strikers, transferred in.  Another Brazilian, Santiago, a central defender, would arrive mid-season.  Daegu improved in 2004 to 10th place in the league, which due to Incheon United's entry, now boasted 13 clubs.

The K-League revised its playing structure following the prolonged 2003 season, and now required each club to play home and away matches in two stages (each club playing 12 matches in each stage) against the other participating clubs; the winners of each stage qualifying for a playoff phase along with the top two teams from the overall table.  This meant that only 24 regular season games were played.  In contrast to the previous season, Daegu had a reasonable offensive record, scoring 30 goals during the season, second only to eventual champion Suwon.  Daegu's Brazilian import, Nonato, finished the season as the club's leading scorer (and the K-league's overall runner-up), with 13 goals from 23 appearances.  However, the club's defensive record was the worst in the league.  Furthermore, in the FA Cup, Daegu were knocked out in the round of 32 by National League side Hallelujah FC.

In the Samsung Hauzen Cup, a new cup competition run as a league competition specifically for K-League clubs (thus excluding National League and lower tier clubs) during the K-League's mid-season break, Daegu finished 8th out of 13 teams.  Nonato again featured prominently on the scorekeeper's chart, being runner-up in goals scored.  Nonato would subsequently be loaned to FC Seoul for the 2005 season.

Squad

Player In/Out

In

Out

Statistics

|}

K-League

Standings

Korean FA Cup

Matches

Hauzen Cup

Standings

See also
Daegu F.C.

External links
Official websites
  Daegu FC Official website 

Daegu FC seasons
Daegu FC